The  U-21 National Football Championship, also known as M. Dutta Ray Trophy, is an Indian football tournament held for players under 21 years of age. This trophy was named after Manindra Nath Dutta Ray, former president of the AIFF. This was introduced when Olympic football became a U-23 event in 1992 Summer Olympics at Barcelona in Spain. The 19th and last edition was held in Gurgaon and Faridabad in Haryana state from 15 to 28 February 2010.  The Goa football team won the 2010 tournament by beating Haryana football team 1-0 in the final.

Results
The following is the list of winners and runners-up:

References 

Football cup competitions in India
Youth football in India
Youth football competitions